Protestant theological faculty in Novi Sad (Serbian: Protestantski teološki fakultet u Novom Sadu) is a Protestant Reformed theological educational institution in Novi Sad, Serbia. It has an interdenominational board of directors, faculty, and student body.

History
The Protestant theological faculty in Novi Sad formally opened in 2000, but its roots go back much further. 

As of November 2005, over 80 degrees and certificates have been awarded.

External links
 

Education in Novi Sad
Religion in Vojvodina
Reformed church seminaries and theological colleges
Christianity in Serbia